The Urmetazoan is the hypothetical last common ancestor of all animals, or metazoans. It is universally accepted to be a multicellular heterotroph — with the novelties of a germline and oogamy, an extracellular matrix (ECM) and basement membrane, cell-cell and cell-ECM adhesions and signaling pathways, collagen IV and fibrillar collagen, different cell types (as well as expanded gene and protein families), spatial regulation and a complex developmental plan, and relegated unicellular stages.

Choanoflagellates
All animals are posited to have evolved from a flagellated eukaryote. Their closest known living relatives are the choanoflagellates, collared flagellates whose cell morphology is similar to the choanocyte cells of certain sponges.

Molecular studies place animals in a supergroup called the opisthokonts, which also includes the choanoflagellates, fungi, and a few small parasitic protists. The name comes from the posterior location of the flagellum in motile cells, such as most animal spermatozoa, whereas other eukaryotes tend to have anterior flagella as well.

Five hypotheses
Five different hypotheses for the animals' last common ancestor have been put forward. The relationships between the different animal phyla themselves are not well-resolved, so discriminating between the hypotheses is difficult.

Placula hypothesis

Under the placula hypothesis, the last common ancestor of animals was a somewhat amorphous blob, lacking any form of symmetry or axis. The centre of this blob became raised slightly from the sediment, creating a cavity that assisted feeding on the sea floor below. As this cavity developed, it became deeper and deeper, until the organisms resembled a thimble, with an inside and outside. Some sponges and cnidaria have this kind of body form.

The development of the bilaterian body plan follows from this hypothesis; the urbilaterian would develop its symmetry as one end of the placula became adapted for moving forward, which would result in a left-right symmetry.

Planula hypothesis

This idea, proposed by Otto Bütschli,
suggests that metazoa are derived from planula; that is, the larva of certain cnidaria, or the adult form of the placozoans. Under this hypothesis, the larva became sexually mature through paedomorphosis, and could reproduce without passing through a sessile phase.

Gastraea hypothesis

The Gastraea hypothesis was proposed by Ernst Haeckel, shortly after his work on the calcareous sponges. He proposed that this group of sponges is monophyletic with all eumetazoans, including the bilaterians. This suggests that the gastrulation and the gastrula stage are universal for eumetazoans. It has been perceived as problematic that gastrulation by invagination is by no means universal among eumetazoans. Only recently has an invagination been confirmed in a Calcarea sponge, albeit too early to form a remaining inner space (archenteron).

Bilaterogastraea hypothesis

This hypothesis was developed by Gösta Jägersten as an adaptation of Ernst Haeckel's Gastraea hypothesis. He proposed that the Bilaterogastraea have a two-stage life cycle, with a pelagic juvenile and a benthic adult stage. The invagination of the original gastrula stage he saw as bilaterally symmetric rather than radially symmetric.

Phagocytella hypothesis

Proposed by Élie Metchnikoff.

See also

References

External links
 Biota (Taxonomicon)
 Life (Systema Naturae 2000)
 Vitae (BioLib)
 Wikispecies – a free directory of life

Evolutionary biology
Evolution of animals
Last common ancestors